Agdistis tugai is a moth of the family Pterophoridae. It is found in southern Tajikistan. The habitat consists of tugai forest consisting of Populus diversifolia trees and Tamarix shrubs.

The wingspan is about 26 mm for females. The head is whitish to pale grey. The antenna are grey. The forewings are whitish to greyish white with brown scales and speckled. The hindwings are greyish and plain-coloured.

Etymology
The species name is derived from the habitat type at the type locality, which is known as a tugai forest.

References

Moths described in 2008
Agdistinae